The Capture of Agra Fort ended a month-long siege by Suraj Mal on 12 June 1761. After a one month siege of Agra the Mughal army, led by Mirza Fazilka Khan, surrendered to the Jat army. The Jats occupied Agra, the old capital of Mughal Empire. It remained in possession of Bharatpur State rulers until 1774.

Background
Jats began to expand the boundaries of their kingdom. They expanded their territory to eastern Rajasthan, western Uttar Pradesh, southern Haryana, and Delhi. The Jat ruler of Bharatpur Suraj Mal controlled over the Braj region. Agra had to be merged with his territory to dominate.

Battle
Surajmal's army (four thousand Jat soldiers) advanced towards Agra. After a month's siege, on 12 June 1761, Surajmal offered peace terms and promised the Qiledar, Fazilka Khan, one lakh money with five villages and Agra Fort came under the control of Surajmal. They also melted the two silver doors of the famous Mughal monument Taj Mahal. It remained under the control of Bharatpur rulers until 1774. After the Jats captured the fort of Agra, the Jats had stuffed straw in the Taj Mahal of Agra.

Aftermath
After capturing Agra Fort, Suraj Mal became more powerful and dominant. He now became the ruler of the area of Yamuna. For the Jats, the capture of Agra was an emotional moment. About 90 years ago, just a short distance away from the gate of this fort, Gokula was cut and thrown. Surajmal thus avenged himself. Jats ruled Agra for 13 years from 1761 to 1774. In 1774 the Mughal Commander Mirza Najaf Khan re-captured Agra.

See also 
Battle of Delhi (1764)

References

External links 
Suraj Mal at Britannica

Agra 1761
1761 in India
Military history of India
Agra 1761
Agra